"Hello! Hello! Who's Your Lady Friend?" is an English music hall song from 1913, with music by Harry Fragson and words by Worton David and Bert Lee.  

The song was recorded by Fragson in 1913, and by both Stanley Kirkby and Ted Yorke in the following year.  It became a popular marching song among soldiers in the First World War.  It was later performed and recorded by many other singers.

References

External links
  Lyrics

1913 songs
Songs written by Bert Lee